Cha Bum-kun (or  ; born 22 May 1953) is a South Korean former football manager and player, nicknamed Tscha Bum or "Cha Boom" in Germany because of his thunderous ball striking ability. He showed explosive pace and powerful shots with his thick thighs. He is widely regarded as one of the greatest Asian footballers of all time.

In 1972, Cha had been capped for the South Korea national team as the youngest player of the time at the age of 18. He is the youngest player to ever reach 100 international caps in the world at 24 years and 35 days, and the all-time leading goalscorer of the South Korean national team with 58 goals. After dominating Asian competitions including the 1978 Asian Games, he left for West Germany and played for Eintracht Frankfurt and Bayer Leverkusen. He scored a total of 121 goals in two Bundesliga clubs, and won the UEFA Cup with each team.

After his retirement, he opened a football academy to develop youth players in South Korea, and managed the national team for the 1998 FIFA World Cup.

Early life
Cha was born in Hwaseong, Gyeonggi. He originally joined Yeongdo Middle School to learn football, but the school's football club was dissolved as soon as he joined there. He started his football career by transferring to Kyungshin Middle School after playing field hockey for Yeongdo for one and a half years. In his high school days, he tried to leave school due to older students' violence, but continued to play football with the manager Chang Woon-soo's help. He became a notable player of Kyungshin High School, and was selected for the South Korean under-20 team in 1970.

Club career

Career in South Korea 
Cha entered Korea University in 1972, and won the Korean National Championship in 1974, the predecessor of the Korean FA Cup. After his graduation, he started his senior career with Korea Trust Bank FC in 1976. He led his team to the title and was named the best player in the spring season of the Korean Semi-professional League. In October 1976, he joined Air Force FC to serve his mandatory military service. Cha originally had a plan to enlist in the Navy FC, but the ROK Air Force persuaded him that it would move his discharge up by six months.

Darmstadt 98 
While playing for the national team in the 1978 Korea Cup, Cha attracted the attention of an Eintracht Frankfurt coach Dieter Schulte, who had received an invitation to serve as an scout/observer at that tournament. In November 1978, Schulte sent a letter to the KFA (Korea Football Association), suggesting Cha's tryout in West Germany, who would be discharged from the ROK Air Force in January 1979. Cha had taken time off to leave for Frankfurt after the 1978 Asian Games in December and succeeded to contract with another Bundesliga club Darmstadt 98 by signing a six-month deal. However, he spent just less than a month in Darmstadt. The ROK Air Force didn't follow the contract with Cha, and ordered his return. After his debut match against VfL Bochum on 30 December, Cha returned to South Korea due to his complicated issue about military service on 5 January. He eventually spent the remainder of the duration of his military service until 31 May, and so could not play for Darmstadt.

Eintracht Frankfurt 
After being discharged from the military service completely, Cha still wanted to play in Bundesliga, and joined Eintracht Frankfurt at age 26 in July 1979. He scored in three consecutive games from third to fifth matchday of the Bundesliga, making an immediate impact early in his new club. He was also acclaimed by showing great performances helping Frankfurt to win its first-ever UEFA Cup title. He was evaluated as the "unstoppable player" by Sir Alex Ferguson, (Aberdeen's manager at the time) and "one of the best attackers in the world" by Lothar Matthäus. (an opponent player at the UEFA Cup Final and the Bundesliga) In addition to a UEFA Cup title, he was named along with Karl-Heinz Rummenigge and Kevin Keegan in the Bundesliga Team of the Season by kicker. On 23 August 1980, Cha's spine had been cracked by Jürgen Gelsdorf, who had tackled behind him, but came back to the stadium after a month. Afterwards, he scored six goals in six matches of the 1980–81 DFB-Pokal, leading Frankfurt to the title. He became Frankfurt's top goalscorer for three consecutive seasons.

Bayer Leverkusen 
However, Cha transferred to Bayer Leverkusen due to a financial difficulty of Frankfurt in 1983. In the 1985–86 Bundesliga, he scored his most goals in a single Bundesliga season with 17 goals, and Leverkusen qualified for the UEFA Cup for the first time as the sixth-placed team. The magazine kicker once again selected him for the Team of the Season. In the 1988 UEFA Cup Final, he scored a dramatic equaliser against Espanyol to tie the game 3–3. Leverkusen eventually went on to win the game on penalties, holding its first European title.

Cha retired in 1989 after playing 308 Bundesliga games as a fair player. During his Bundesliga career, he scored 98 goals without a penalty, and received only one yellow card. On 31 October 1987, he scored his 93rd Bundesliga goal, becoming the top foreign goalscorer by surpassing Willi Lippens. His scoring record wasn't broken for eleven years until Stéphane Chapuisat scored more goals than him. As of 2018, Cha is ranked seventh along with Pierre-Emerick Aubameyang in the Bundesliga's foreign goalscorer standings.

International career 
Cha generally played the Bundesliga games as a striker, but he had originally been a winger in South Korea. He became a South Korean under-20 international in 1970, and took part in the AFC Youth Championship in 1971 and 1972. In the 1972 AFC Asian Cup, he made his senior international debut against Iraq, and scored his first international goal against Khmer Republic. He was named in the Korean FA Best XI for seven consecutive years, and was selected as the Korean FA Player of the Year in 1973.

Cha usually played for the national team in the Korea Cup, Pestabola Merdeka and King's Cup, which were annually contested between Asian nations and the invited clubs at the time. He won a total of ten trophies and also left memorable games in three competitions. In the 1975 Pestabola Merdeka, he scored his first international hat-trick against Japan. In the 1976 Korea Cup, he scored a hat-trick against Malaysia during five minutes from 83rd to 88th minute, leading South Korea to a dramatic 4–4 draw.

In the 1978 FIFA World Cup qualification, he played all of South Korea's twelve matches, and recorded five goals and two assists, although his knee got a boil during the competition. However, South Korea failed to qualify for the World Cup by finishing the qualification as runners-up despite his struggle.

In the 1978 Asian Games, he scored two goals and provided two assists, contributing to team's gold medal. However, he showed lethargic plays to prepare tryouts for Bundesliga clubs, and received criticisms. After the 1978 Asian Games, he left for the Bundesliga and didn't play for South Korea. His last international tournament was the 1986 FIFA World Cup, South Korea's first World Cup since 1954. He showed exemplary performance in intensive checks by opponents, but failed to prevent South Korea's elimination in the group stage.

Managerial career 
Cha moved into management with K League side Hyundai Horang-i, coaching them from 1991–94. His next appointment in January 1997 was Korean national team coach and he led the nation to the 1998 FIFA World Cup; however, a disastrous 5–0 defeat at the hands of the Netherlands in Korea's second group game got Cha fired. He later blamed the KFA for the bad performance, citing lack of bonuses and alleging pro soccer games in Korea were fixed. The association promptly slapped a five-year ban on him and he soon left the country with his wife.

After an 18-month spell coaching Shenzhen Ping'an in China, Cha took up a commentator position with MBC in Korea. He returned to coaching in late 2003 when offered the Suwon Samsung Bluewings position. Cha achieved immediate success with Suwon by lifting the 2004 K League championship, an achievement he ranked as even better than the UEFA Cup he won as a player in 1988. He later resigned in June 2010 as Suwon manager.

Personal life 
Cha is a devout Christian and said the faith is one of his three biggest values along with family and football.

Cha's second child, Cha Du-ri, also played for South Korean national team and Bundesliga clubs, following in his father's footsteps.

In November 2019, Cha received the Cross of Merit from the German government.

Career statistics

Club

International 

The KFA is showing the list of Cha's 136 international appearances in its official website. The RSSSF is also claiming 136 appearances about Cha's international career, but its details have some discrepancies. FIFA registered him with 130 appearances in the FIFA Century Club by excluding six matches in the Summer Olympics qualification.
 
Scores list South Korea's goal tally first.

Honours

Player
Korea University
Korean National Championship: 1974

Korea Trust Bank
Korean Semi-professional League (Spring): 1976

ROK Air Force
Korean National Championship runner-up: 1976

Eintracht Frankfurt
UEFA Cup: 1979–80
DFB-Pokal: 1980–81

Bayer Leverkusen
UEFA Cup: 1987–88

South Korea U20
AFC Youth Championship runner-up: 1971, 1972

South Korea
Asian Games: 1978
AFC Asian Cup runner-up: 1972

Individual
IFFHS World Player of the Century 60th place: 1900–1999
IFFHS Legends: 2016
IFFHS Asia's Player of the Century: 1900–1999
IFFHS Asian Men's Team of the Century: 1901–2000
IFFHS Asian Men's Team of All Time: 2021
Asian/Oceanian Team of the 20th Century: 1998
ESPN Greatest Asian Footballer of All Time: 2015
Korean FA Best XI: 1972, 1973, 1974, 1975, 1976, 1977, 1978
Korean FA Player of the Year: 1973
Korean FA Hall of Fame: 2005
Korean Semi-professional League (Spring) Best Player: 1976
Korean Sports Hall of Fame: 2017
kicker Bundesliga Team of the Season: 1979–80, 1985–86
Eintracht Frankfurt All-time XI: 2013

Records
Youngest player in the world to reach 100 caps: 24 years, 35 days
South Korea all-time top goalscorer: 58 goals

Manager
Hyundai Horang-i
Korean League Cup runner-up: 1993

Suwon Samsung Bluewings
Pan-Pacific Championship: 2009
A3 Champions Cup: 2005
K League 1: 2004, 2008
Korean FA Cup: 2009
Korean League Cup: 2005, 2008
Korean Super Cup: 2005

Individual
AFC Coach of the Month: February 1997, May 1997, September 1997
AFC Coach of the Year: 1997
K League 1 Manager of the Year: 2004, 2008
Korean FA Cup Best Manager: 2009

See also
 List of top international men's football goalscorers by country
 List of men's footballers with 100 or more international caps
 List of men's footballers with 50 or more international goals

Notes

References

External links 

 
 
 
 

1953 births
Living people
People from Hwaseong, Gyeonggi
Association football forwards
Association football wingers
South Korean footballers
South Korean expatriate footballers
South Korea international footballers
South Korean football managers
SV Darmstadt 98 players
Eintracht Frankfurt players
Bayer 04 Leverkusen players
Bundesliga players
Expatriate footballers in West Germany
1972 AFC Asian Cup players
1986 FIFA World Cup players
1998 FIFA World Cup managers
South Korea national football team managers
Ulsan Hyundai FC managers
Suwon Samsung Bluewings managers
FIFA Century Club
Sportspeople from Gyeonggi Province
South Korean expatriate sportspeople in West Germany
South Korean Christians
Korea University alumni
Asian Games gold medalists for South Korea
Medalists at the 1978 Asian Games
Asian Games medalists in football
UEFA Cup winning players
Recipients of the Cross of the Order of Merit of the Federal Republic of Germany
Footballers at the 1978 Asian Games